In general relativity, a spacetime is said to be static if it does not change over time and is also irrotational. It is a special case of a stationary spacetime, which is the geometry of a stationary spacetime that does not change in time but can rotate.  Thus, the Kerr solution provides an example of a stationary spacetime that is not static; the non-rotating Schwarzschild solution is an example that is static.

Formally, a spacetime is static if it admits a global, non-vanishing, timelike Killing vector field  which is irrotational, i.e., whose orthogonal distribution is involutive. (Note that the leaves of the associated foliation are necessarily space-like hypersurfaces.) Thus, a static spacetime is a stationary spacetime satisfying this additional integrability condition. These spacetimes form one of the simplest classes of Lorentzian manifolds. 

Locally, every static spacetime looks like a standard static spacetime which is a Lorentzian warped product R  S with a metric of the form

,

It is from the latter fact that a static spacetime obtains its name, as the geometry of the space-like slice S does not change over time.

Examples of static spacetimes
 The (exterior) Schwarzschild solution.
 de Sitter space (the portion of it covered by the static patch).
 Reissner–Nordström space.
 The Weyl solution, a static axisymmetric solution of the Einstein vacuum field equations  discovered by Hermann Weyl.

Examples of non-static spacetimes
In general, "almost all" spacetimes will not be static. Some explicit examples include:
 Spherically symmetric spacetimes, which are irrotational, but not static.
 The Kerr solution, since it describes a rotating black hole, is a stationary spacetime that is not static.
 Spacetimes with gravitational waves in them are not even stationary.

References

 

Lorentzian manifolds